Goodenia nigrescens is a species of flowering plant in the family Goodeniaceae and is endemic to northern Australia. It is an erect herb with narrow oblong to lance-shaped leaves on the stems and racemes of orange-yellow flowers.

Description

Taxonomy and naming
Goodenia nigrescens was first formally described in 1990 Roger Charles Carolin in the journal Telopea from specimens collected in 1960 on Banka Banka Station by George Chippendale. The specific epithet (nigrescens) means "becoming black", referring to the tendency of the plant to turn black when dried.

Distribution and habitat
This goodenia grows in grey and black soils on the Barkly Tableland, and in Queensland.

Conservation status
Goodenia nigrescens is classified as "data deficient" under the Northern Territory Government Territory Parks and Wildlife Conservation Act 1976 but as of "least concern" under the Queensland Government Nature Conservation Act 1992.

References

nigrescens
Flora of the Northern Territory
Flora of Queensland
Plants described in 1990
Taxa named by Roger Charles Carolin
Endemic flora of Australia